Zora or Old Zora is an unincorporated community in eastern Benton County, Missouri, United States.

A post office called Zora was established in 1887, and remained in operation until 1931. The etymology of the name Zora is uncertain.

References

Unincorporated communities in Benton County, Missouri
Unincorporated communities in Missouri